The Ministry of Production of Peru is the sector of the Executive charged with formulating, approving, executing, and supervising all levels of production, industry, manufacturing, and fishing.

Its competency extends to natural and juridical persons who conduct activities vinculated to the industry and fishing subsectors, counting with a Vice Ministry for each of these subsectors.

, the minister of production is Jorge Luis Prado.

External links
 

Production